The 2013–14 Seattle Redhawks women's basketball team represented Seattle University during the 2013–14 NCAA Division I women's basketball season. The Redhawks, led by fifth year head coach Joan Bonvicini, played their home games at the Connolly Center and were a members of the Western Athletic Conference. The Redhawks claimed the #3 seed in the WAC and advanced to their second consecutive WAC Championship game. The Redhawks would finish the season 16–16, 9–7 in the conference.

Roster

Schedule

|-
!colspan=9 style="background:#BA0C2F; color:#FFFFFF;"| Exhibition

|-
!colspan=9 style="background:#BA0C2F; color:#FFFFFF;"| Regular Season

|-
!colspan=9 style="background:#FFFFFF; color:#BA0C2F;"| 2014 WAC tournament

Source

See also
2013–14 Seattle Redhawks men's basketball team

References

Seattle Redhawks women's basketball seasons
Seattle
Seattle Redhawks
Seattle Redhawks